Eremarionta is a genus of air-breathing land snails, terrestrial pulmonate gastropod mollusks in the family Helminthoglyptidae.

Species
Species within the genus Helminthoglypta include:
 White desert snail (Eremarionta immaculata)
 Thousand Palms desert snail (Eremarionta millepalmarum)
 Morongo desert snail (Eremarionta morongoana)

References

 
Helminthoglyptidae
Taxa named by Henry Augustus Pilsbry
Gastropod genera
Taxonomy articles created by Polbot